Fernand Deferm (born 29 October 1940) is a Belgian former professional road cyclist. He most notably won the 1965 Grote Prijs Jef Scherens, outsprinting Eddy Merckx.

Major results
1965
 1st Grote Prijs Jef Scherens
 3rd Paris–Tours
 4th Overall Ronde van Nederland
 5th Kampioenschap van Vlaanderen
 5th Ronde van Limburg
1966
 1st Ronde van Limburg
1967
 3rd Ronde van Limburg
 6th Kampioenschap van Vlaanderen
 8th Schaal Sels

References

External links

1940 births
Living people
Belgian male cyclists
People from Lummen
Cyclists from Limburg (Belgium)